Ray Saltmarsh (born 18 October 1952) is a former Australian rules footballer who played with Collingwood in the Victorian Football League (VFL).

Notes

External links 		

		
		

1952 births
Australian rules footballers from Victoria (Australia)		
Collingwood Football Club players
Preston Football Club (VFA) players
Living people